
Gmina Dobre Miasto is an urban-rural gmina (administrative district) in Olsztyn County, Warmian-Masurian Voivodeship, in northern Poland.

Villages
Apart from the town of Dobre Miasto, Gmina Dobre Miasto contains the villages and settlements of Barcikowo, Bzowiec, Cerkiewnik, Głotowo, Jesionowo, Kabikiejmy, Kabikiejmy Dolne, Kłódka, Knopin, Kosyń, Kunik, Łęgno, Mawry, Międzylesie, Nowa Wieś Mała, Orzechowo, Piotraszewo, Podleśna, Praslity, Smolajny, Stary Dwór, Swobodna, Urbanowo and Wichrowo.

Neighbouring gminas
Gmina Dobre Miasto is bordered by the gminas of Dywity, Jeziorany, Lidzbark Warmiński, Lubomino and Świątki.

References
Polish official population figures 2006

Dobre Miasto
Olsztyn County